Kushgeh Darreh (also Romanized as Kūshgeh Darreh; also known as Kosk Darreh and Kūshk Darreh) is a village in Kani Bazar Rural District, Khalifan District, Mahabad County, West Azerbaijan Province, Iran. At the 2006 census, its population was 233, in 41 families.

References 

Populated places in Mahabad County